A neck guard (also called a Kim Crouch collar) is a piece of protective equipment worn by players around the neck area, particularly by (though not exclusively) players in the ice skating team sports of ice hockey, bandy, ringette, and rinkball. The guard is designed to prevent injury to the neck by ice hockey pucks, ringette rings, bandy balls, the metal blades on ice skates, and various types of sticks, i.e. ice hockey sticks. This piece is especially critical to goaltenders, especially ice hockey goaltenders, who are more likely at risk to be injured in this area.

In Canada, neck protectors worn by ringette and ice hockey players must contain fabric that is BNQ certified and approved. BNQ stands for Bureau de normalisation du Québec. Based in Quebec, BNQ is an organization that created the standard for cut-resistant neck guards. The test requires the neck guard have a certain amount of coverage that is determined by standards that BNQ developed. The test is a blade on a swinging test apparatus that is run across the neck guard to test for cut penetration. One such example of neck guards of this type are manufactured by Bauer Hockey.

Most neck guards have a moisture system which helps keep the guard cool, ensuring the player's neck won't become too hot while working.

Development
The guard was developed in Ontario, Canada, after Kim Crouch, goalkeeper of the Royal York Royals, suffered a serious neck injury when a neck artery was sliced by a skate when he dived into a fray during a 1975 match against the Markham Waxers. Both teams were competing in the Ontario Provincial Junior A Hockey League. Kim Crouch's father, Ed Crouch, developed a prototype neck-guard to help him return to the game. The guard was subsequently widely adopted by ice hockey players.

Goaltender injuries 

Buffalo Sabres goalie Clint Malarchuk suffered a severe injury during a game against the St. Louis Blues on March 22, 1989, when Steve Tuttle collided in front of Malarchuk's goal and his skates got caught on the front of Malarchuk's neck, slicing open his internal jugular vein. Malarchuk made a full recovery, but would have almost certainly died if medical assistance was not provided. Ever since then, many National Hockey League (NHL) goaltenders have worn neck guards, such as Henrik Lundqvist, Marc-André Fleury, and Semyon Varlamov. However, it isn't required for NHL goaltenders to wear them.

On February 10, 2008, Florida Panthers forward Richard Zedník was behind the play and skating into the right corner of the Buffalo Sabres' zone, when teammate Olli Jokinen lost his balance after being checked by Clarke MacArthur. Jokinen fell head-first to the ice, his right leg flew up and struck Zedník directly on the side of the neck, hitting Zedník's external carotid artery. Clutching his neck, Zedník raced to the Florida bench, leaving a long trail of blood along the way, and nearly falling into the arms of a team trainer. He fully recovered from the injury. Neck guards have been mandatory for all players in Sweden following the 1996 death of Bengt Åkerblom in a similar accident.

References

Ice hockey equipment
Protective gear
Neckwear

The Spokesman-Preview. 2008.Malarchuk can relate to Zednik’s injury.https://www.spokesman.com/stories/2008/feb/13/malarchuk-can-relate-to-zedniks-injury.[22 February 2021].